James Scurry (1766–1822) was a British soldier and memoirist. He was held captive by Hyder Ali and Tipu Sultan for 10 years (1780–1790) at Seringapatam. He had been kept as a prisoner, first at Bangalore and then moved to the Seringapatnam fort. After his escape from Tipu's army, in Chitterdroog, he reached an English camp. He prepared a narrative of his captivity in 1794, but it was not published until 1824, after his death.

He is known for his memoir The captivity, sufferings, and escape of James Scurry, who was detained a prisoner during ten years, in the dominions of Hyder Ali and Tippoo Saib (1824), which relates the sufferings and treatment of the captured English soldiers, Mangalorean Catholics, and other prisoners of war by Hyder Ali and Tipu Sultan, the rulers of the Kingdom of Mysore in India.

Early life and family
James Scurry was born in Devonshire, England.  His father served in the British Army and was present at the 1775 Battle of Bunker Hill early in the American Revolutionary War, where he was promoted to the post of paymaster-sergeant for his bravery. Later, he became the inmate of a Greenwich mental asylum where he died, leaving his widow with James and his sister. James Scurry went to sea at a very early age. He went on his first voyage when he was nearly seven years old. He spent a considerable time on the American coast and the West Indies and was employed to carry gunpowder. He was also very good at playing the fife.

Capture by Hyder
In 1780, when Scurry was 14 years old, he set on a voyage from Plymouth Sound on the Hannibal. However, he, along with his crew, were captured by the French in the Gulf of Bengal within 5 days sailing of Madras. They were handed over to Hyder Ali by the French admiral Suffren. Hyder deported Scurry and the 15 young men to Seringapatam. The 15 men were all circumcised, converted to Islam and forcibly conscripted to Tipu's army. James Scurry was given the Islamic name, Shamsher Khan.

Captivity
As soon as Scurry was captured, he was put in heavy leg-irons and marched into a strong prison. Later, Hyder ordered him and his crew to march to Bangalore. Scurry was then sent to Burrampour, a three-day march from Bangalore. The food offered was rice for the first eight to ten days, which was then changed to Ragi flour. Scurry had the misfortune of being overlooked, along with 100 other English prisoners in the prisoner release incorporated in the treaty of 1784.

Escape from captivity
Scurry on his own account explains how he escaped from the fort of Chitterdroog (Chitradurga). Once he tried to escape with some more of his colleagues, but after some distance, returns on fears of being spotted. Again, he escapes in the next try, but this time, they venture into the forest to avoid being detected. They camp in multiple places, and try entering a couple of forts. They finally seek the help of Marathas in a fort, from where they leave for the English encampments in a fort north of Karnataka. He was greeted by an old Scottish colleague, Mr. Little, who was startled to find Scurry and his companions in the ragged uniform of Tipu's army. James further narrates how they are redeployed, and marched backwards to the Carnatic to help plan the final assault on Mysore by Lord Cornwallis. Due to some circumstances, his friends are divided into two groups, and one group is sent to Bombay, and he is sent to Madras. In Madras, he boards Dutton, a ship to send him back to England, and he reaches Down in England. He also tells that even though his release was negotiated between Tipu and the British, it was not implemented for reasons unknown. Instead he was abruptly shifted along with many other prisoners to Chitterdroog. During this shift, James fears for his life, as he was taken to a place where some of his colleagues Captain Rumney, and Lieutenants Fraser and Sampson, had their throats cut.

Scurry left behind his wife and child, a girl. He had grown to love her, and in his memoir describes the immense pain he felt in having to part from them in the night as his battalion was being mustered and his decision of escaping being made. After the 10-year captivity ended, James Scurry recounted that he had forgotten how to sit in a chair and use a knife and fork. His English was broken and stilted, having lost all his vernacular idiom. His skin had darkened to the 'swarthy complexion of negroes', and moreover, he had developed an aversion to wearing European clothes. Scurry later reverted to Christianity, upon his return to England.

Life after return to England
After reaching England, Scurry took up many jobs first as a superintendent of a wholesale grocer, and then set up his own grocery business. In 1800, he married once more and had 8 children, of which only one son and one daughter survived. He moved on from his grocery business to join a colliery, and then as a steward for a merchant ship, and then moved back to London in 1816 to work for a coal wharf. His final job was to superintendent a mine, but due to cold weather, he developed severe cold and infection, and died in 1822, at the age of 57. He was buried in Exeter on December 14, 1822.

Descriptions of conditions in Srirangapatna
James mentions the unbearable conditions during his captivity, and also describes the tribulations, and pain he went through during his incarceration. Here are some of his comments

Initiation of prisoners of war including James into Islam:

Method of killing people who refused to convert or try to escape from prison:

Common use of cutting hands, ears and noses as punishment:

Tipu not honouring prisoner exchange by shifting prisoners from one camp to another or killing them:

The scheme of threat and punishment to collect revenue from various quarters:

James description of Seringapatam:

The systematic rape of girls collected and captured from various parts of his kingdom was described by James. In this paragraph, James and his colleagues are forced to have sex with local girls captured from Tipu's kingdom or otherwise. The reason why Tipu chose to let prisoners have the captured women is not known, but it seems that it could have served various purposes. One was to humiliate the women themselves. Second, could have been to provide restraint to the prisoners, so it would serve as a deterrent for them to escape, as many of them had children with these women, and married them as well. Later in the story, James narrates how a British officer, could not escape the prison camp, as their guilt of leaving the women behind, kept them from escaping. So, the intent of letting the British prisoners consummate those women, was indeed useful in that regard.

Account of the Captivity

The following is James's first-hand account of the treatment of Mangalorean Catholic captives. Also this is the first time, James mentions that Tipu had converted some of the Hindu temples into prisons or dungeons. The practice of capturing women and passing them on as slaves to officers, and moving some of them to his harem is also mentioned.

Musings of Scurry about Tipu and his reign 

Scurry noted the esteem in which Tipu was held in Britain, though he condemned the methods of cruelties that he unleashed on his subjects and prisoners of war:

Scurry also contrasted the practises of Tipu with those of the European powers and his reputation among Europeans in India who knew him:

See also
Captivity of Mangalorean Catholics at Seringapatam

Citations

References

1766 births
1822 deaths
Military personnel from Devon
Royal Navy sailors
British prisoners of war
British memoirists
British Christians
British former Muslims
Converts to Christianity from Islam